Mark B. Perry is an American television producer and writer.

He has written and produced for the television series The Wonder Years, Law & Order, One Tree Hill, Brothers & Sisters, Pasadena, What About Brian, Windfall, Party of Five, its spin-off Time of Your Life and Ghost Whisperer, the latter three series all starred Jennifer Love Hewitt. Perry won a Primetime Emmy Award in 1993 for his work on Picket Fences, as a part of the producing and writing team.

He was a writer and co-executive producer on the ABC series Revenge.

References

External links

Television producers from Georgia (U.S. state)
American television writers
American male television writers
Emmy Award winners
Living people
Writers from Atlanta
Year of birth missing (living people)
Screenwriters from Georgia (U.S. state)
20th-century American screenwriters
20th-century American male writers
21st-century American screenwriters
21st-century American male writers